The 1957 National League was the 23rd season and the twelfth post-war season of the highest tier of motorcycle speedway in Great Britain.

Summary
The closure of Wembley Lions, Bradford Tudors and Poole Pirates left the league with only four teams, so the seven sides in Division Two merged to make an eleven-team first tier and so Division Two became defunct.

Bradford Tudors returned to replace Birmingham Brummies mid-season and Swindon Robins followed up their Division Two title in 1956 with the Division One title in 1957.

Final table

Bradford Tudors replaced Birmingham Brummies mid-season.

Top Ten Riders (League only)

National Trophy
The National Trophy was not held during 1957.

See also
 List of United Kingdom Speedway League Champions
 Knockout Cup (speedway)

References

Speedway National League
1957 in speedway
1957 in British motorsport